Torstad is a village in Nærøysund municipality in Trøndelag county, Norway. The Torstad Chapel is located here, which serves this area of Nærøy.

References

Villages in Trøndelag
Nærøysund
Nærøy